(often stylized in capital letters such as STARS) is a professional wrestling stable, currently performing in the Japanese professional wrestling promotion World Wonder Ring Stardom. Lead by Mayu Iwatani, the stable currently consists of Saya Iida/Super Strong Stardom Machine, Hanan, Koguma, Hazuki and Momo Kohgo.

History

Under Mayu Iwatani (2018-present)

The stable has been considered the union of the well-meaning ladies of the World Wonder Ring Stardom promotion since 2017 and became an official faction in the course of the Stardom Draft from April 15, 2018, with Mayu Iwatani as the basic leader, and Starlight Kid, Saki Kashima, Shiki Shibusawa, Natsumi and Tam Nakano as their five picks. Hanan also remained part of them without being mentioned. They had their first match as an official stable on April 21, 2018, at Stardom Rebirth, where Mayu Iwatani, Saki Kashima & Starlight Kid teamed up to defeat Queen's Quest (AZM, Konami and Momo Watanabe) in a six-man tag team match.

Arisa Hoshiki won the Stardom Cinderella Tournament 2019 by defeating Konami in the finals on April 29. Saki Kashima and Tam Nakano fell short in the first rounds and Starlight Kid made it to the semi-finals.

2020
At the Stardom Cinderella Tournament 2020 on March 24, Iwatani, Kid and Tam Nakano competed in the event, with Iwatani and Kid falling short into the first round matches, and Nakano losing to Natsuko Tora in the semi-finals. At Stardom Cinderella Summer In Tokyo on July 26, 2020, Mayu Iwatani and Saya Iida fell short to Syuri and Himeka, Starlight Kid unsuccessfully challenged Riho and AZM for the High Speed Championship, and Tam Nakano unsuccessfully challenged Giulia for the Wonder of Stardom Championship. At Stardom Yokohama Cinderella 2020 on October 3, Tokyo Cyber Squad's Jungle Kyona and Konami fell short to Oedo Tai's Natsuko Tora and Saki Kashima in a Loser unit must disband match. After the match, the broken Cyber Squad's Kyona, Death Yama-san, Rina and Ruaka were invited to join Stars which they all accepted. Konami joined Oedo Tai. At Stardom Sendai Cinderella 2020 on November 15, Saya Iida unsuccessfully challenged Maika for the Future of Stardom Championship, Starlight Kid defeated Hanan, Hina, Riho and Saya Kamitani in a five-way match, Gokigen Death unsuccessfully challenged AZM for the High Speed Championship and Mayu Iwatani dropped the World of Stardom Championship to Utami Hayashishita.

Cosmic Angels' departure (December 2020)
On October 25, 2020, following Tam Nakano's pairing with a debuting Mina Shirakawa into the 2020 edition of the Goddesses of Stardom Tag League, Mayu Iwatani officially announced Shirakawa as a full member of Stars. Nakano would name their tag team as "Cosmic Angels". On November 14, 2020, Unagi Sayaka from Tokyo Joshi Pro Wrestling debuted in Stardom and joined the sub-unit of Cosmic Angels. At Road to Osaka Dream Cinderella - Day 2 on December 16, 2020, Nakano, Shirakawa and Sayaka teamed up to defeat Oedo Tai's Bea Priestley, Natsuko Tora and Saki Kashima to win the Artist of Stardom Championship. On December 20, 2020, at Osaka Dream Cinderella, Nakano announced that she, Shirakawa and Sayaka were splitting from Stars to act as a separate stable.

2021
At Stardom All Star Dream Cinderella on March 3, 2021, Starlight Kid, Saya Iida, and Gokigen Death competed in a 24-women Stardom All Star Rumble featuring various wrestlers from the past such as Chigusa Nagayo, Kyoko Inoue, Mima Shimoda, Hiroyo Matsumoto, Momoe Nakanishi and many others, and Mayu Iwatani defeated Yoshiko in a singles match. At Stardom Yokohama Dream Cinderella 2021 on April 4, Mayu Iwatani, Saya Iida, Starlight Kid, Hanan and Gokigen Death fell short to Oedo Tai's Natsuko Tora, Ruaka, Konami, Saki Kashima and Rina in a Ten-woman elimination tag team match in which the last one eliminated was forced to join the enemy unit. Since Gokigen Death was eliminated last, she was forced to join Oedo Tai. At the beginning of the Stardom Cinderella Tournament 2021, Stars only counted four members. Iwatani, Hanan and Starlight Kid, with all of them being scheduled to take part into the tournament except Saya Iida who was out with injury. On the first night from April 10, Hanan fell short to Himeka, Starlight Kid defeated Momo Watanabe, and Mayu Iwatani defeated Fukigen Death, all matches having been disputed in the first-round matches. On the second night from May 14, Hanan fell short to Natsupoi, Lady C and Tam Nakano in a four-way match, while Starlight Kid fell short to Saya Kamitani and Mayu Iwatani to Himeka in the second-round mactches. Koguma made her return and saved Stars from an Oedo Tai attack and subsequently joined the unit. On the third night from June 12, Mayu Iwatani, Starlight Kid, Hanan, Koguma and Rin Kadokura, an associate from Pro Wrestling Wave teamed up to fall short to Oedo Tai's Natsuko Tora, Konami, Fukigen Death, Ruaka and Saki Kashima in another Ten-woman elimination tag team match, where this time Starlight Kid was the last to get eliminated and was forced to join Oedo Tai since. At Yokohama Dream Cinderella 2021 in Summer on July 4, Hanan teamed up with Hina to compete in a Gauntlet tag team match won by Konami and Fukigen Death, and also involving the teams of Maika and Lady C and Saki Kashima and Rina. Next, Mayu Iwatani and Koguma unsuccessfully challenged Alto Livello Kabaliwan (Giulia and Syuri) for the Goddess of Stardom Championship. Mayu Iwatani and Koguma were the only members of Stars to compete in the Stardom 5 Star Grand Prix 2021. They both wrestled in the "Red Stars" and scored a tying eleven points after going against Momo Watanabe, Starlight Kid, Himeka, Fukigen Death, Natsupoi, Giulia, Mina Shirakawa and Saki Kashima. At Stardom 10th Anniversary Grand Final Osaka Dream Cinderella on October 9, 2021, Hazuki defeated Koguma in her return match and mayu Iwatani fell short to Tam Nakano in a Wonder of Stardom Championship match. At the 2021 edition of the Goddesses of Stardom Tag League, Hazuki and Koguma competed as the team of FWC, Mayu Iwatani alongside Rin Kadokura went under the name of Blue MaRine, and Hanan engaged in a makeshift team with Rina known as Water & Oil. BlueMarine competed in the "Blue Goddess Block" and the other two sub-units in the "Red Goddess Block". Hazuki and Koguma would eventually win the tournament by defeating previous winner MOMOAZ (Momo Watanabe and AZM). During the event, on November 4, Hazuki joined the unit. At Kawasaki Super Wars, the first event of the Stardom Super Wars trilogy of pay-per-views which took place on November 3, Hanan and Rina teamed up to fall short to Saki Kashima and Fukigen Death in an inter-event crossing match with the Goddess Tag League, Mayu Iwatani and Koguma fell short to Himeka and Natsupoi, and Hazuki unsuccessfully challenged Utami Hayashishita for the World of Stardom Championship. At Tokyo Super Wars on November 27, Mayu Iwatani, Hazuki and Hanan defeated Saki Kashima, Fukigen Death and Rina, and Koguma unsuccessfully challenged Starlight Kid for the High Speed Championship. At Osaka Super Wars, the last event from December 18, 2021, Mayu Iwatani, Hazuki and Koguma teamed up to compete in a ¥10 Million Unit Tournament. They defeated Cosmic Angels (Tam Nakano, Mina Shirakawa and Unagi Sayaka) in the semi-finals but fell short to MaiHimePoi (Maika, Natsupoi and Himeka) in the finals which were also disputed for the Artist of Stardom Championship. At Stardom Dream Queendom on December 29, 2021, Hanan defeated Ruaka to win the Future of Stardom Championship, Koguma unsuccessfully challenged AZM and Starlight Kid in a three-way match for the High Speed Championship and Mayu Iwatani teamed up with Takumi Iroha to defeat Hazuki and Momo Watanabe in a shuffled tag team match.

2022

At Stardom in Osaka event from January 23, 2022, Momo Kohgo requested Stars members to let her join the unit which the latters accepted. At Stardom Nagoya Supreme Fight on January 29, 2022, Momo Kohgo defeated Fukigen Death, Ruaka, Saki Kashima and Rina in an elimination five-way match, Hanan defeated Lady C to retain the Future of Stardom Championship, Hazuki and Koguma defeated Maika and Himeka to retain the Goddess of Stardom Championship and Mayu Iwatani went into a 30 minute time-limit draw against Giulia in a match to establish the number one contender for the World of Stardom Championship. Stardom's president Rossy Ogawa however sanctioned this as giving both Giulia and Iwatani the contendership for the title at Stardom World Climax 2022. At Stardom Cinderella Journey on February 23, 2022, Hanan defended the Future of Stardom title successfully against fellow stablemate Momo Kohgo, Mayu Iwatani teamed up with Tam Nakano to defeat Fukigen Death and Saki Kashima, and Hazuki and Koguma successfully defended the Goddess of Stardom Championship against Mina Shirakawa and Unagi Sayaka. At Stardom New Blood 1 on March 11, 2022, Momo Kohgo defeated Gatoh Move Pro Wrestling's Sayaka, and Hanan and a returning Saya Iida defeated Professional Wrestling Just Tap Out's Tomoka Inaba and Aoi. On the first night of the Stardom World Climax 2022 from March 25, Hanan defended the Future of Stardom title against Rina, Hazuki and Koguma dropped the Goddess titles to Black Desire (Momo Watanabe and Starlight Kid), and Mayu Iwatani and a returning Kairi defeated Tam Nakano and Unagi Sayaka. On the second night from March 27, Hanan defended the Future title again against Mai Sakurai, Saya Iida and Momo Kohgo took part in a 18-women Cinderella Rumble match won by Mei Suruga and also featuring various wrestlers who competed at Stardom New Blood 1 such as Haruka Umesaki, Nanami, Maria, Ai Houzan, and Yuna Mizumori, and in the main event, Mayu Iwatani unsuccessfully challenged Syuri for the World of Stardom Championship. On the first night of the Stardom Cinderella Tournament 2022 from April 3, in the first round matches, Hazuki defeated Miyu Amasaki, Koguma defeated Fukigen Death, Saya Iida defeated Rina, Mayu Iwatani defeated Momo Kogho, and Hanan fell short to Maika. Hazuki and Koguma battled in the semi-finals of the tournament from April 29, 2022, with Koguma picking a win over her FWC tag partner and qualifying into the finals where she fell short to Mirai. At Stardom Golden Week Fight Tour on May 5, 2022, Hanan, Saya Iida and Momo Kohgo defeated Saki Kashima, Ruaka and Rina in a six-woman tag team match, and Hazuki and Koguma regained the Goddess of Stardom Championship by defeating Momo Watanabe and Starlight Kid and becoming the first team to ever win the titles on more than one occasion. Mayu Iwatani won the SWA World Championship by defeating Thekla and becoming the promotion's second-ever "grand slam champion" alongside Io Shirai, winning all the available championships except the Future of Stardom title which is not required. At Stardom Flashing Champions on May 28, 2022, Momo Kohgo and Saya Iida teamed up with Lady C to defeat Ami Sourei, Hina and Rina, Hanan successfully retained the Future of Stardom Championship against Ruaka, Mayu Iwatani successfully retained the SWA World Championship against Fukigen Death and Hazuki and Koguma successfully defended the Goddess of Stardom Championship against Giulia and Mai Sakurai. At Stardom Fight in the Top on June 26, 2022, Momo Kohgo and Saya Iida picked up a victory over Lady C and Miyu Amasaki, and Mayu Iwatani, Koguma and Hazuki defeated Queen's Quest's Utami Hayashishita, Saya Kamitani and AZM in one of the first steel cage matches ever promoted by Stardom. At Stardom New Blood 3 on July 8, 2022, Hanan, Momo Kohgo and Saya Iida defeated JTO (Tomoka Inaba, Aoi and Misa Kagura). At Mid Summer Champions in Tokyo, the first event of the Stardom Mid Summer Champions which took place on July 9, 2022, Hanan successfully defended the Future of Stardom Championship against Waka Tsukiyama, Mayu Iwatani, Hazuki, Koguma and Saya Iida fell short to Oedo Tai's Saki Kashima, Ruaka, Rina and Fukigen Death and Momo Kohgo unsuccessfully challenged AZM for the High Speed Championship. At Stardom in Showcase vol.1 on July 23, 2022, Mayu Iwatani, Saya Iida who impersonated a masked character, Hazuki, Hanan and Momo Kohgo took part in a rumble match, and then Iida competed for the second time unmasked ans she teamed up with Ami Sourei in a losing effort against Maika and Himeka, Koguma competed in a four-way falls count anywhere match won by AZM and also involving Momo Watanabe and Tam Nakano. At Mid Summer Champions in Tokyo, the first event of the Stardom Mid Summer Champions which took place on July 9, 2022, Hanan successfully defended the Future of Stardom Championship against Waka Tsukiyama, Mayu Iwatani, Hazuki, Koguma and Saya Iida fell short to Oedo Tai (Saki Kashima, Ruaka, Rina and Fukigen Death), and Momo Kohgo unsuccessfully challenged AZM for the High Speed Championship. At Mid Summer Champions in Nagoya from July 24, 2022, Hanan and Saya Iida defeated Mai Sakurai and Rina Amikura, Mayu Iwatani and Momo Kohgo defeated Fukigen Death and Ruaka, and Hazuki and Koguma successfully defended the Goddess of Stardom Championship against Ami Sourei and Mirai. At Stardom x Stardom: Nagoya Midsummer Encounter on August 21, 2022, Hanan successfully defended the Future of Stardom Championship against Miyu Amasaki, Mayu Iwatani, Saya Iida & Momo Kohgo fell short to Utami Hayashishita, AZM & Lady C, and Hazuki and Koguma dropped the Goddess of Stardom Championship to Tam Nakano and Natsupoi. At Stardom New Blood 4 on August 26, 2022, Saya Iida and Momo Kohgo fell short to Mai Sakurai and Linda, and Hanan successfully defended the Future of Stardom Championship against Aoi. At Stardom in Showcase vol.2 on September 25, 2022, Hanan defeated Saya Iida in a 5 Star Grand Prix Tournament match and Mayu Iwatani picked up a victory against Maika alongside Ram Kaicho and AZM as a result of a Falls Count Anywhere Four-Way Match. At Stardom New Blood 5 on October 19, 2022, Momo Kohgo defeated Rhythm, and Hanan dropped the Future of Stardom Championship to Ami Sourei. At Hiroshima Goddess Festival on November 3, 2022, Saya Iida unsuccessfully challenged AZM, Lady C, Miyu Amasaki and Waka Tsukiyama in a five-way match, Hazuki and Koguma defeated Saki Kashima and Ruaka, and Mayu Iwatani defeated Alpha Female to retain the SWA World Championship. After the match, Iwatani relinquished the title to focus on the IWGP Women's Championship. At Stardom Gold Rush on November 19, 2022, Saya Iida and Momo Kohgo unsuccessfully challenged Natsuko Tora and Ruaka, and Lady C and Miyu Amasaki in a three-way tag team match, and Mayu Iwatani, Hazuki and Koguma won a "Moneyball tournament" by defeating Giulia, Thekla and Mai Sakurai in the finals. At Stardom in Showcase vol.3 on November 26, 2022, Koguma won a four-way match resembling the 2022 FIFA World Cup, also involving Starlight Kid, Ram Kaicho and AZM, Hanan and Saya iida fell short to 7Upp (Nanae Takahashi and Yuu) in one of their tag league matches, Mayu Iwatani teamed up with Hanan and Maika to defeat Utami Hayashishita, Hina and Mirai in a "judo rules match", and Hazuki teamed up with a returning Sumire Natsu in a losing effort against Natsuko Tora and Saki Kashima. At Stardom Dream Queendom 2 on December 29, 2022, Saya Iida competed in a Stardom rambo, and Mayu Iwatani, Momo Kohgo and Hanan defeated Hazuki, Koguma and Iida in an intern stable six-man tag team match clash.

2023
At Stardom New Blood 7 on January 20, 2023, Momo Kohgo teamed up with Momoka Hanazono in a losing effort against Mai Sakurai and Chanyota, and Saya Iida and Hanan fell short against Ami Sourei and Nanami in the quarterfinals of the inaugural New Blood Tag Team Championship. At Stardom Supreme Fight 2023 on February 4, 2023, Hazuki, Saya Iida and Koguma defeated Starlight Kid, Haruka Umesaki and Ruaka in a Triangle Derby I group stage match, and Mayu Iwatani and Momo Kohgo competed in a call your shot match for any title of choice

New Japan Pro Wrestling (2020-present)
Due to Stardom's relationship with New Japan Pro Wrestling, various of the unit's members are often competing in the latter's promotion events. On January 4, 2020, at Wrestle Kingdom 14, Mayu Iwatani teamed up with Arisa Hoshiki to defeat Hana Kimura and Giulia.  On January 5, 2021, at Wrestle Kingdom 15, Iwatani teamed up with Tam Nakano in a losing effort against Alto Livello Kabaliwan (Giulia and Syuri). On January 5, 2022, at Wrestle Kingdom 16, Iwatani teamed up with Starlight Kid in a losing effort against Tam Nakano and Saya Kamitani. At Rumble on 44th Street on October 28, 2022, Iwatani successfully defended the SWA World Championship against KiLynn King. At Historic X-Over on November 20, 2022, Saya Iida, Hanan, Koguma and Momo Kohgo competed in the Stardom Rambo, while Mayu Iwatani unsuccessfully challenged Kairi in the finals of the inaugural IWGP Women's Championship.

Members

Current
{|class="wikitable sortable" style="text-align:center;"
|-
!colspan="2"|Member
!Joined
|-
|Mayu Iwatani
|I*
|
|-
|Hanan
|*
|
|-
|Saya Iida
|
|
|-
|Koguma
|
|
|-
|Hazuki
|
|
|-
|Momo Kohgo
|
|

Associate

Former

Timeline

Sub-groups

Current
{|class="wikitable sortable" style="text-align:center;"
|-
!Affiliate
!Members
!Tenure 
!Type
|-
|FWC/Fukuoka Double Crazy
|HazukiKoguma
|2021–present
|Tag team
|-
|wing★gori
|HananSaya Iida/Super Strong Stardom Machine
|2020–present
|Tag team
|-
|Classmates
|HazukiKogumaSaya Iida/Super Strong Stardom Machine
|2023–present
|Trio
|-
|H&M's
|Mayu IwataniHananMomo Kohgo
|2023–present
|Trio

Former
{|class="wikitable sortable" style="text-align:center;"
|-
!Affiliate
!Members
!Tenure 
!Type
!Notes
|-
|DREAM SHiNE
|Tam NakanoArisa Hoshiki
|2019–2020
|Tag team
|-
|Cosmic Angels
|Tam NakanoMina ShirakawaUnagi Sayaka
|2020
|Tag team/Trio
|
|-
|MK☆Sisters
|Mayu IwataniStarlight Kid
|2020–2021
|Tag team
|-
|BlueMarine
|Mayu IwataniRin Kadokura
|2021
|Tag Team
|rowspan=2|
|-
|Water & Oil
|RinaHanan
|2021
|Tag team

Championships and accomplishments 
 Pro Wrestling Illustrated
Singles wrestlers
 Ranked Iwatani No. 9 of the top 100 female singles wrestlers in the PWI Women's 100 in 2018
 Ranked Hoshiki No. 28 of the top 100 female singles wrestlers in the PWI Women's 100 in 2019
 Ranked Kid No. 51 of the top 100 female singles wrestlers in the PWI Women's 100 in 2018
 Ranked Nakano No. 76 of the top 100 female singles wrestlers in the PWI Women's 100 in 2018
 Ranked Koguma No. 91 of the top 150 female singles wrestlers in the PWI Women's 150 in 2022
 Ranked Hazuki No. 101 of the top 150 female singles wrestlers in the PWI Women's 150 in 2022
 Ranked Hanan No. 132 of the top 150 female singles wrestlers in the PWI Women's 150 in 2022
Tag teams
 Ranked FWC (Hazuki and Koguma) No. 5 of the top 100 tag teams in the PWI Tag Team 100 of 2022
 Tokyo Sports
 Women's Wrestling Grand Prize 
World Wonder Ring Stardom
World of Stardom Championship (1 time) – Mayu Iwatani
Wonder of Stardom Championship (1 times) – Arisa Hoshiki
Goddess of Stardom Championship (3 times) – Mayu Iwatani and Saki Kashima (1) and Hazuki and Koguma (2)
Artist of Stardom Championship (3 times) – Mayu Iwatani, Saki Kashima and Tam Nakano (2), and Tam Nakano, Mina Shirakawa and Unagi Sayaka (1)
SWA World Championship (1 time) – Mayu Iwatani
Future of Stardom Championship (3 times) – Starlight Kid, Saya Iida and Hanan 
 Cinderella Tournament (2019) – Arisa Hoshiki
Goddesses of Stardom Tag League (2021) – Hazuki and Koguma
 5★Star GP Award (1 time)
 5★Star GP Red Stars Best Bout – 
 Stardom Year-End Award (10 times)
 Match of the Year – 
 Most Valuable Player Award – 
 Special Merit Award – 
 Best Unit Award (2018, 2022)
 Best Technique Award – 
 Best Tag Team Award – 
 Outstanding Performance Award –

Notes

See also
Neo Stardom Army
Donna Del Mondo
Cosmic Angels
Queen's Quest
God's Eye
Oedo Tai

References

External links 

 

Independent promotions teams and stables
Japanese promotions teams and stables
Women's wrestling teams and stables
World Wonder Ring Stardom teams and stables